Nerilla is a genus of annelids belonging to the family Nerillidae.

The species of this genus are found in Europe, Northern America, Pacific Ocean.

Species:

Nerilla antennata 
Nerilla australis 
Nerilla digitata 
Nerilla inopinata 
Nerilla jouini 
Nerilla marginalis 
Nerilla mediterranea 
Nerilla parva 
Nerilla rotifera 
Nerilla stygicola 
Nerilla taurica

References

Polychaetes
Polychaete genera